William Langford DD (d. 21 January 1814) was a Canon of Windsor from 1787 to 1814

Career
He was educated at King's College, Cambridge.

He was appointed:
Lower Master (Ostiarius) of Eton College 1775
Prebendary of the 3rd stall at Worcester 1785 - 1787
Vicar of Nether Stowey, 1796
Rector of Newdigate, Surrey
Vicar of Isleworth 1801
Fellow of Eton

He was appointed to the fifth stall in St George's Chapel, Windsor Castle in 1787 and held the canonry until 1814.

Notes 

1814 deaths
Canons of Windsor
Alumni of King's College, Cambridge
Year of birth missing